Jenny Ryan (born 1982) is an English game show personality.

Jennifer Ryan may refer to:

 Jenny Ryan, a character on Castle; see List of Castle characters#Jenny Ryan
 Jennifer Ann Ryan (born 1963), real name of Australian romance writer Jennie Adams
 Jennifer A. Ryan, 2004 candidate for U.S. Vice President for the Christian Freedom Party (see presidential candidate Thomas Harens)